Schlick or Schlicke may refer to:

People
 Moritz Schlick, German philosopher and the founding father of logical positivism and the Vienna Circle
 Arnolt Schlick, German organist and composer of the Renaissance
 Robert H. Von Schlick, German-born United States Army private
 Ernst Otto Schlick, German engineer
 Katherine Schlick Noe, Professor of Education at Seattle University
 Björn Schlicke, German footballer
 Heinz Schlicke, German-born engineer and author
 The Counts von Schlick, who became one of the richest noble families in Bohemia from coins named Joachimsthaler minted from silver found in their land in Joachimsthal.

Other
 Schlick's approximation, an approximation of the BRDF of metallic surfaces
 Schlick, onomatopoeic slang for female masturbation
German-language surnames
 Vito Schlickmann (1928-2023), Brazilian Roman Catholic prelate